Farol de Pedra de Lume is a lighthouse in the eastern point of the island of Sal in northeastern Cape Verde at the small port of Pedra de Lume and 5 km east of the city of Espargos. The chapel was completed in 1853, the lighthouse was completed in 1855.

See also
List of lighthouses in Cape Verde

References

External links

Pedra de Lume
Sal, Cape Verde